The mines of the West Coast of Tasmania have a rich historical heritage as well as an important mineralogical value in containing or having had found, specimens of rare and unusual minerals.  Also, the various mining fields have important roles in the understanding of the mineralization of the Mount Read Volcanics, and the occurrence of economic minerals.

List of named mines
The list below is a partial collation of the names of mines that have existed, a considerable number are found on or adjacent to the West Coast Range.  Other mines and leases with different names may have existed.

The place names after the name of the mine are as found in records, and may not be accurate.  
Where possible, subheadings are created for entries such as Mount Lyell, where different workings at the mine were named, and some common usages do not necessarily relate to company or Mines Department records
It is not a list of exploration leases, or "finds" where a mineral has been found on the west coast.

 Adelaide Proprietary Mine, Dundas 
 Austral Mine, Zeehan
 Boulder Mine, North Dundas
 Britannia Mine, Zeehan
 British-Zeehan Mine, Zeehan
 Central Balstrup Mine, Zeehan
 Colebrook Mine, Rosebery 
 Comet Mine, Dundas
 Comstock Mine, Zeehan
 Cumberland Tin Mine, Mount Heemskirk
 Curtin Davis Mine, Dundas
 Dundas Extended, Dundas 
 East Hercules Mine, Rosebery
 Farrell Mine, Tullah (also as North Farrell) 
 Federation Mine, Mount Heemskirk 
 Fraser Creek Mine, North East Dundas
 Grubbs Mine, Zeehan 
 Hal Jukes, Mount Jukes
 Hecla Curtin Mine, Dundas 
 Henty Gold Mine, Henty River
 Hercules Mine, Mount Read
 Hydes, Mount Jukes (West)
 Jukes Proprietary, Mount Jukes
 Junction Mine, Zeehan
 King Jukes Mine, Crotty
 Lake Jukes, Crotty
 Magnet Mine, Waratah
 Maynes Mine, Mount Heemskirk
 Melba Mine, North Dundas
 Montana Mine, Zeehan
 Montana Western Extended Mine
 Mount Black Mine, Rosbery
 Mount Bischoff tin mine, Mount Bischoff
 Mount Darwin, Mount Darwin,
 Mount Farrell Mine, Tullah
 Mount Lyell Mining and Railway Company operations at Mount Lyell, Queenstown
 Cape Horn
 Comstock (also known as Lyell Comstock, in close proximity to Cape Horn)
 Crown Lyell
 Flux Quarry
 Iron Blow – site lost with opening of the large open cut
 Lyell Blocks
 Open Cut (see also West Lyell Open Cut)
 Prince Lyell
 Royal Tharsis Open cut
 Royal Tharsis underground
 Tharsis
 Twelve West
 West Lyell  (also known as the West Lyell Open Cut)
 West Tharsis
 North Farrell Mine, Tullah 
 North Mount Lyell, Gormanston
 Oonah Mine, Zeehan
 Queen Jukes, Mount Jukes
 Prince Darwin, Mount Darwin
 Razorback Mine, Dundas
 Renison Bell Mine, Renison Bell
 Silver Queen Mine, Zeehan
 Silversteam Mine, Zeehan
 Spray Mine, Zeehan
 Susanite Mine, Zeehan 
 Tasmanian Copper Mine, Rosebery
 Taylours Reward, Mount Jukes
 Tenth Legion Mine, Zeehan
 West Comet Mine, Dundas

List of Mining Field names 
There are also designated mineral or mining 'fields' by government authority

 Dundas
 Jukes-Darwin Mining Field
 Mount Farrell Mining Field
 North Dundas
 North Heemskirk
 Read – Rosebery
 Rosebery
 South Heemskirk
 Zeehan

Mining fields 1881-1890 
Earlier informally named areas - Source: Binks 1988  - map 3 - pages 54–55

 Corrinna alluvial gold field
 South Heemskirk tin field
 Zeehan silver-lead field
 Dundas silver-lead field
 North east Dundas gold field, Ring River
 King River gold mine
 Princess River gold mine
 Linda gold field

Smelters 
 Crotty
 Mount Lyell
 Tasmanian Metals Extraction Company, Rosebery, smelter

Railways, trams and haulages
 See Railways on the West Coast of Tasmania

Training and Educational 
 Mt Lyell School of Mines and Industries in Queenstown 
 Zeehan School of Mines and Metallurgy

See also
 Geology of Tasmania
 West Coast Range

Notes

References
 
 
 
 
 Tuma, Andrew and Bottrill, R.S.(2006) "The minerals of Western Tasmania:Introduction, history and geological setting" in Australian Journal of Mineralogy, volume 12, No.2, December 2006
 
 

History of Tasmania
Western Tasmania
Underground mines in Australia
Surface mines in Australia
Mining in Tasmania